The Kabardians (Highland Adyghe: Къэбэрдей адыгэхэр; Lowland Adyghe: Къэбэртай адыгэхэр) or Kabardinians are one of the twelve major Circassian tribes, representing one of the twelve stars on the green-and-gold Circassian flag. They are also commonly known by the plural terms Kabardin, Kebertei, or Kabarday. Along with the Besleney tribe, they speak a distinctive dialect of the Adyghe language. Historically the Kabardians lived in Kabardia, a region of the north Caucasus. In modern times the Kabardians live mostly in the Russian republic of Kabardino-Balkaria, which partly corresponds to the historic region.

Despite the Soviet administrative divisions that placed Circassians under four different designations and political units, namely Adygeans (Adyghe in Adygea), Cherkessians (Adyghe in Karachay-Cherkessia), Kabardians (Adyghe in Kabardino-Balkaria), and Shapsugians (Adyghe in Krasnodar Krai), all four groups are essentially the same people (Adyghe). Furthermore,  Cherkessians are mostly of the Kabardian and Besleney tribes.

Population 
The Kabardians  are the largest Circassian (Adyghe) tribe in the world in general, and form the largest Circassian tribe in Russia, Turkey,  Egypt, and in some other countries in the region.  Kabardians numbered around 520,000 in Kabardino-Balkaria, Russia. and about 50,000 in Karachay-Cherkessia, Russia.  In Turkey, where more than 1 million of them live, they are concentrated on the Uzunyayla plateau of Kayseri Province and around (Central Turkey), though there are Kabardian villages in Balıkesir, Düzce, Eskişehir (Northwest Turkey), Çorum, Samsun, and Tokat (Black Sea region), amongst many others. Significant populations of Kabardians also live in Jordan;
and there are communities in the United States. However, in Israel and Jordan, the Shapsug and Abzakh tribes respectively are the largest.

Religion 
Religions historically practiced by Kabardians include the native Adyghe Xabze faith, Christianity and Islam. The majority of Kabardians had converted to Islam by the early 19th century. There are also still some adherents to traditional Xabze beliefs, with 1,8% being practiced in Kabardino-Balkaria, although most Kabardians are either Non-denominational or Sunni Muslims of the Hanafi school

Kabardians also constituted one of the earliest Christian communities in Europe, converting in the late 2nd and early 3rd Centuries. Kabardians living in Mozdoksky District in the Republic of North Ossetia–Alania are Orthodox Christians. Some of the Kabardians living in the southern part of the neighbouring Kursky district of Stavropol Krai are also Orthodox Christians.
There are also some Roman Catholic Kabardians (possibly descended from families who reportedly converted from Orthodoxy during the 13th century). According to the 2012 survey census, of the 240,000 Catholics who lived in Russia, 1.8% were Kabardians.

Notable Kabardians 
 Aleguko Shogenukov
 Alexander A. Cherkassky
 Alexey Cherkassky – Chancellor of the Russian Empire during the reign of Empress Elizabeth
 Alexander Bekovich-Cherkassky – Prince of Kabarda
 Alexander N. Bekovich-Cherkassky
 Amirkhan Shomakhov
 Atazhuko Atazhukin
 Armande Kumpal Kabartay Altaï-Magini
 Aslanbek Khushtov – Member of the Parliament of Kabardino-Balkarian Republic and athlete who has won a gold medal in the 2008 Summer Olympics
 Avenir Tchemerzine – Colonel of the Russian imperial army and mathematician before becoming a bibliographer
 Bidar Kadın – Imperial consort of Abdul Hamid II of the Ottoman Empire
 Boris Cherkassky
 Dmitry Cherkassky
 Doamna Ecaterina Cercheza – Princess consort of the Voivode of Moldavia as the wife of Vasile Lupu
 Elmirza Bekovich-Cherkassky
 Fyodor A. Bekovich-Cherkasski
 Fyodor N. Bekovich-Cherkasski
 Grigory Cherkassky
 Idar of Kabardia
 Inal the Great – Prince of Kabarda
 Ismail Bey Atazhukin
 Ivan Amashuk
 Ivan B. Cherkassky – Cousin of Michael I of Russia
 Ivan E. Cherkassky
 Jacop Cherkassky
 Kasbulat Cherkassky
 Kasei Atazhukin
 Kambulat Cherkassky
 Kelemet Cherkassky
 Kudenet Cherkassky
 Kurgoko Atazhukin
 Ladislas du Luart, Comtesse Leïla Hagondokoff – Recipient of the National Order of Merit and National Order of the Legion of Honor (Commander), model for the French high-fashion house Chanel
 Ludmilla Monique Tchérina
 Mahidevran – Imperial consort of Suleiman the Magnificent of the Ottoman Empire
 Mamstryuk Cherkassky
 Maria Temryukovna – Tsaritsa of the Tsardom of Russia as the wife of Ivan the Terrible
 Michael A. Cherkassky I
 Michael A. Cherkassky II
 Michael T. Cherkassky
 Michael Y. Cherkassky
 Mutsal Cherkassky
 Nikita Egupov-Cherkassky
 Peter Amashukov-Cherkassky
 Peter B. Cherkassky
 Roslanbek Atazhukin
 Rusudan of Circassia – Queen consort of Georgia (Kartli) as the wife of Vakhtang the Lawgiver
 Servetseza Kadın – First wife of Abdulmejid I of the Ottoman Empire
 Sholokh Cherkassky
 Simon Cherkassky
 Sunchalei Cherkassky
 Temryuk – Prince of Kabarda
 Vasily Amashukov-Cherkassky
 Vasily Kardanukovich Cherkassky
 Vladimir Cherkassky – Mayor of Moscow (1868–1870)
 Yefim Bekovich-Cherkassky
 Yuri Temirkanov – Music Director and Chief Conductor of the Saint Petersburg Philharmonic Orchestra since 1988
 Zaur Tutov

See also 

 Kabardia
 Other Circassian tribes:
 Abzakh
 Besleney
 Bzhedug
 Hatuqwai
 Mamkhegh
 Natukhai
 Shapsug
 Temirgoy
 Ubykh
 Yegeruqwai
 Zhaney

References 

Circassians
Circassian tribes
Ethnic groups in Russia
History of Kuban
Kabardino-Balkaria
Karachay-Cherkessia
Muslim communities of Russia
Ossetia
Adygea
Ethnic groups in Turkey
Ethnic groups in Jordan